Northwestern University is an educational institution based in Evanston, Illinois, United States.

Other higher education institutions with almost the same names include:

Northwest University (China), in Xi'an
Northwestern University (Philippines), in Laoag
Northwestern University in Qatar, in Al-Rayyan
North Western University, Bangladesh, Khulna

Other higher education institutions with Northwestern in their names:

Northwestern California University School of Law, Sacramento, California
Northwestern Health Sciences University, Bloomington, Minnesota
Northwestern Oklahoma State University, Alva, Oklahoma
Northwestern Polytechnic University, Fremont, California
Northwestern State University, Natchitoches, Louisiana
University of Northwestern Ohio, Lima, Ohio
University of Northwestern – St. Paul, Saint Paul, Minnesota
Northwestern Christian University, former name of Butler University, Indianapolis, Indiana
Northwestern Polytechnical University, Xi'an, Shaanxi, China
Lyceum-Northwestern University, Dagupan, Pangasinan, Philippines

See also
Northwest University (disambiguation)
Northwestern College (disambiguation)